The 1951–52 Yorkshire Cup was the forty-fourth occasion on which rugby league's Yorkshire Cup competition was held. Wakefield Trinity won the trophy by beating Keighley in the final.

Background 

This season no junior/amateur clubs were invited to take part, but newly elected to the  league Doncaster were added to the  competition, thus the  number of entrants remained at the same as last season's total number of sixteen.

This in turn resulted in no byes in the first round.

The  competition again followed the  original formula of a knock-out tournament, with the  exception of the  first round which was still played on a two-legged home and away basis.

Competition and results

Round 1 - First leg 
Involved 8 matches (with no byes) and 16 clubs

All first round ties are played on a two-legged home and away basis

Round 1 - Second leg  
Involved  8 matches (with no byes) and 16 clubs

All first round ties are played on a two-legged home and away basis

Round 1 - Replay  
Involved 1 match and 2 clubs

Round 2 - quarterfinals 
Involved 4 matches and 8 clubs

All second round ties are played on a knock-out basis

Round 3 – semifinals  
Involved 2 matches and 4 clubs

Both semi-final ties are played on a knock-out basis

Final 
This was Keighley's only appearance in a Yorkshire Cup final (except for the 1943 Wartime final). Wakefield Trinity won the trophy by beating Keighley by the score of 17-3. The match was played at Fartown, Huddersfield, now in West Yorkshire. The attendance was 25,495 and receipts were £3,347

Teams and scorers 

Scoring - Try = three (3) points - Goal = two (2) points - Drop goal = two (2) points

The road to success 
All the ties in the  first round were played on a two leg (home and away) basis.

For the  first round ties, the first club named in each of the ties played the first leg at home.

For the  first round ties, the scores shown are the aggregate score over the two legs.

Notes and comments 
1 * The first Yorkshire Cup match to be played by newly elected to the league, Doncaster, and also at this stadium

2 * The  receipts are given as £3,237 by the official Huddersfield 1952 Yearbook but given as £3,227 by "100 Years of Rugby. The History of Wakefield Trinity 1873-1973" and £3,347 by RUGBYLEAGUEproject  and by the  Rothmans Rugby League Yearbook of 1991-92 and 1990-91

3 * Fartown was the home ground of Huddersfield from 1878 to the end of the 1991-92 season to Huddersfield Town FC's Leeds Road stadium, and then to the McAlpine Stadium in 1994. Fartown remained as a sports/Rugby League ground but is now rather dilapidated, and is only used for staging amateur rugby league games.

Due to lack of maintenance, terrace closures and finally major storm damage closing one of the stands in 1986, the final ground capacity had been reduced to just a few thousands although the record attendance was set in a Challenge cup semi-final on 19 April 1947 when a crowd of 35,136 saw Leeds beat Wakefield Trinity 21-0

General information for those unfamiliar 
The Rugby League Yorkshire Cup competition was a knock-out competition between (mainly professional) rugby league clubs from  the  county of Yorkshire. The actual area was at times increased to encompass other teams from  outside the  county such as Newcastle, Mansfield, Coventry, and even London (in the form of Acton & Willesden.

The Rugby League season always (until the onset of "Summer Rugby" in 1996) ran from around August-time through to around May-time and this competition always took place early in the season, in the Autumn, with the final taking place in (or just before) December (The only exception to this was when disruption of the fixture list was caused during, and immediately after, the two World Wars)

See also 
1951–52 Northern Rugby Football League season
Rugby league county cups
Keighley RLFC (post war)

References

External links
Saints Heritage Society
1896–97 Northern Rugby Football Union season at wigan.rlfans.com
Hull&Proud Fixtures & Results 1896/1897
Widnes Vikings - One team, one passion Season In Review - 1896-97
The Northern Union at warringtonwolves.org

RFL Yorkshire Cup
Yorkshire Cup